Codonopsis is a genus of flowering plant in the family Campanulaceae. As currently recognized, Codonopsis includes two other groups sometimes separated as distinct genera, i.e. Campanumoea and Leptocodon. The enlarged genus Codonopsis is widespread across eastern, southern, central, and southeastern Asia, including China, Japan, the Russian Far East, Kazakhstan, the Indian Subcontinent, Iran, Indochina, Indonesia, etc.

Uses

Medicinal uses
Codonopsis pilosula is an important medicinal herb in traditional Chinese medicine.

Food uses

Codonopsis lanceolata (Korean: deodeok) is used as a food in Korean cuisine.

Species
Species currently (July 2014) accepted by Kew's World Checklist. Species with no range given are endemic to China

Codonopsis affinis – China, Himalayas, Myanmar
Codonopsis alpina – (高山党参)
Codonopsis argentea – (银背叶党参)
Codonopsis benthamii – China, Himalayas, Myanmar
Codonopsis bhutanica – Bhutan, Nepal, Tibet
Codonopsis bragaensis – Nepal
Codonopsis bulleyana – (管钟党参)
Codonopsis canescens – (灰毛党参)
Codonopsis cardiophylla – (光叶党参)
Codonopsis chimiliensis – Yunnan, Myanmar (滇湎党参)
Codonopsis chlorocodon – (绿钟党参)
Codonopsis clematidea – Central Asia, Tibet, Xinjiang, Iran, Afghanistan, Pakistan, western Himalayas (新疆党参)
Codonopsis convolvulacea – Tibet, Yunnan, Nepal, Bhutan, Assam, Myanmar (鸡蛋参)
Codonopsis cordifolioidea – (心叶党参)
Codonopsis deltoidea – (三角叶党参)
Codonopsis dicentrifolia – Tibet, Nepal, Bhutan, Assam (珠峰党参)
Codonopsis efilamentosa – Yunnan, Myanmar
Codonopsis farreri – Yunnan, Myanmar – (秃叶党参)
Codonopsis foetens – China, eastern Himalayas (臭党参)
Codonopsis forrestii – China, Myanmar
Codonopsis gombalana – (贡山党参)
Codonopsis gracilis – Yunnan, Myanmar, Nepal, Bhutan, Assam
Codonopsis henryi – (川鄂党参)
Codonopsis hirsuta
Codonopsis hongii
Codonopsis inflata Tibet, Nepal, Bhutan, Assam
Codonopsis javanica – widespread across China, Japan, Himalayas, Indochina, Java, Sumatra
Codonopsis kawakamii – Taiwan (台湾党参)
Codonopsis lanceolata – China, Korea, Japan, Russian Far East (羊乳)
Codonopsis levicalyx – (光萼党参)
Codonopsis limprichtii
Codonopsis macrophylla – Tibet
Codonopsis mairei
Codonopsis meleagris – (珠鸡斑党参)
Codonopsis micrantha – (小花党参)
Codonopsis minima – Korea
Codonopsis nepalensis – Nepal
Codonopsis ovata Pakistan, Kashmir
Codonopsis pianmaensis
Codonopsis pilosula – China, Mongolia, Korea, Primorye (党参)
Codonopsis purpurea – Tibet, Yunnan, Himalayas (India, Nepal, Bhutan) (紫花党参)
Codonopsis rosulata – (莲座状党参)
Codonopsis rotundifolia – Tibet, Yunnan, Himalayas (India, Pakistan, Nepal, Bhutan)
Codonopsis subglobosa – (球花党参)
Codonopsis subscaposa – (抽葶党参)
Codonopsis subsimplex – Tibet, Himalayas (India, Nepal, Bhutan) (藏南党参)
Codonopsis thalictrifolia – Tibet, Himalayas (India, Nepal, Bhutan) – (唐松草党参)
Codonopsis tsinglingensis – (秦岭党参)
Codonopsis tubulosa – (管花党参)
Codonopsis ussuriensis – China, Japan, Korea, Primorye (雀斑党参)
Codonopsis vinciflora
Codonopsis viridiflora – (绿花党参)
Codonopsis viridis – Tibet, Himalayas (India, Pakistan, Nepal, Bhutan)

References

Campanuloideae
Campanulaceae genera
Plants used in traditional Chinese medicine
Medicinal plants

Codonopsis Examples and Information